Enrique Plancarte Solís (14 September 1970 – 31 March 2014) was a Mexican drug lord and high-ranking leader of the Knights Templar Cartel, a drug cartel headquartered in the state of Michoacán. Prior to his tenure in the Knights Templar, he was a top leader of the split-off group La Familia Michoacana.

Criminal career
Plancarte Solís was a high-ranking leader of La Familia Michoacana drug cartel. Following the reported death of Nazario Moreno González in 2010, La Familia Michoacana broke off and formed the Knights Templar Cartel, an organized crime gang based in the Mexican state of Michoacán. Plancarte was one of its top lieutenants. His duties were to coordinate the production and smuggling operations of methamphetamine from Mexico into US He was wanted by the governments of Mexico and the U.S.

Kingpin Act sanction
On 25 February 2010, the United States Department of the Treasury sanctioned Plancarte Solís under the Foreign Narcotics Kingpin Designation Act (sometimes referred to simply as the "Kingpin Act"), for his involvement in drug trafficking along with twenty-one other international criminals and ten foreign entities. The act prohibited U.S. citizens and companies from doing any kind of business activity with him, and virtually froze all his assets in the U.S.

Death
Plancarte Solís was killed in a gunfight with soldiers of the Mexican Navy on 31 March 2014 in Colón, Querétaro.

Personal life and family 
In 2014, the Mexican singer Melissa admitted to being Plancarte Solis' daughter. His cousin Jesús Ramírez Plancarte was arrested by Mexican security forces on 22 May 2014. His nephew Mario Loya Contreras was arrested by the Mexican Federal Police in Apatzingán with four other suspected criminals on 5 June 2014.

See also 
Mexican Drug War
Mérida Initiative
War on Drugs

References

1970 births
2014 deaths
Fugitives wanted by Mexico
Fugitives wanted on organised crime charges
La Familia Michoacana traffickers
People of the Mexican Drug War
Mexican drug traffickers
Mexican money launderers
People from Michoacán
People sanctioned under the Foreign Narcotics Kingpin Designation Act
People shot dead by law enforcement officers in Mexico